Hemilienardia pardus is a species of sea snail, a marine gastropod mollusk in the family Raphitomidae.

Description
The length of the shell attains 5.8 mm.

Distribution
This marine species occurs off Tahiti, the Society Islands

References

External links
 Fedosov A.E., Stahlschmidt P., Puillandre N., Aznar-Cormano L. & Bouchet P. (2017). Not all spotted cats are leopards: evidence for a Hemilienardia ocellata species complex (Gastropoda: Conoidea: Raphitomidae). European Journal of Taxonomy. 268: 1-20

pardus
Gastropods described in 2017